The Judo at the 1981 Southeast Asian Games was held between 10 December to 14 December at Fort Bonifacio, Philippines.

Medal summary

Men

Women

Medal table

References
 https://eresources.nlb.gov.sg/newspapers/Digitised/Article/straitstimes19811211-1.2.125.3
 https://eresources.nlb.gov.sg/newspapers/Digitised/Article/straitstimes19811212-1.2.148.2
 https://eresources.nlb.gov.sg/newspapers/Digitised/Article/straitstimes19811214-1.2.122.5
 https://eresources.nlb.gov.sg/newspapers/Digitised/Article/straitstimes19811215-1.2.113

1981 Southeast Asian Games events
Southeast Asian Games
1981
1981 in judo